Moyra is a female given name. Notable people with this name include:

 Moyra Allen (1921–1996), Canadian nurse
 Moyra Barry (1886–1960), Irish artist
 Moyra Browne (1918–2016), British nurse
 Moyra Caldecott (1927–2015), British author
 Moyra Davey (born 1958), American artist
 Moyra Donaldson (born 1956), Northern Irish author
 Moyra Fraser (1923–2009), Australian-born English actress
 Moyra Hiscox (born 1937), British middle-distance runner